A bergère is an enclosed upholstered French armchair (fauteuil) with an upholstered back and armrests on upholstered frames. The seat frame is over-upholstered, but the rest of the wooden framing is exposed: it may be moulded or carved, and of beech, painted or gilded, or of fruitwood, walnut or mahogany with a waxed finish. Padded elbowrests may stand upon the armrests. A bergère is fitted with a loose, but tailored, seat cushion. It is designed for lounging in comfort, with a deeper, wider seat than that of a regular fauteuil, though the bergères by Bellangé in the White House are more formal. A bergère in the eighteenth century was essentially a meuble courant, designed to be moved about to suit convenience, rather than being ranged permanently formally along the walls as part of the decor.     

The fanciful name, "shepherdess chair", was coined in mid-eighteenth century Paris, where the model developed without a notable break from the late-seventeenth century chaise de commodité, a version of the wing chair, whose upholstered "wings" shielding the face from fireplace heat or from draughts were retained in the bergère à oreilles ("with ears"), or, fancifully, bergère confessionale, as if the occupant were hidden from view, as in a confessional. A bergère may have a flat, raked back, in which case it is à la reine, or, more usually in Louis XV furnishings, it has a coved back, en cabriolet. A bergère with a low coved back that sweeps without a break into the armrests is a marquise.

Appearing first in Paris during the Régence (1715–23), the form reaches its full development in the unifying curves of the rococo style, then continues in a more architectural rectilinear style in the Louis XVI, Directoire, and French and American Empire styles.

See also 
 Cabriolet (furniture)

Notes

References

 
 

Chairs